The 1915–16 Princeton Tigers men's ice hockey season was the 17th season of play for the program.

Season

With many returning members, including team captain Grant Peacock, Princeton had high hoped for their season. Before it even began, however, the team received unwelcome news when the operators of the St. Nicholas Rink, still the principle arena for the university's teams, refused to allow the freshman squad to use the venue for either games or practices as they weren't expected to attract enough spectators to offset the cost. As a result, the freshman team was abandoned for the year. Despite the decision, Princeton's varsity squad was rounding into form towards the end of December and looked to be a challenger for the collegiate title.

The team began well, winning their first three games and taking two of three from Yale during their trip to Pittsburgh. Unfortunately, second-leading scorer Willian Humphreys was injured during the series. While Princeton managed to defeat Dartmouth in their next game the team was criticized for over-passing. Their second game of the Intercollegiate league turned out worse as Harvard used the large size of the Boston Arena to their advantage and shut out the Tigers 3–0.

The Tigers recovered with a win against an improving Yale squad but lost any chance they had at the title when Harvard won the second game. The contest was odd in that two 5-minute overtime periods were played with Harvard scoring in both extra sessions. The next game against Cornell was cancelled, leaving the team with a long layoff before their final match against Yale. While their season had not shaped up like they were hoping, there was good news for the program; the ice hockey team was making money. The Princeton athletic department reported that only three of its programs were not costing the university: football, baseball and ice hockey. The ice hockey team turned in profit of $186 for the 1914–15 season compared to a drain of $683 the year before. While the profits were small, the fact that Princeton could still draw during a disappointing season meant that the school would be likely to continue supporting the team unlike fellow schools Brown and Columbia.

Princeton was hoping to end their season with a victory over the Elis but Yale had other ideas. With Ford ineligible to play, the Bulldogs took the rematch and then claimed the series with a second win three night later, handing the Tigers another disappointing finish.

Roster

Standings

Schedule and Results

|-
!colspan=12 style=";" | Regular Season

Scoring Statistics

Note: Assists were not recorded as a statistic.

Goaltending statistics

* 40-minute regulation game time.

References

Princeton Tigers men's ice hockey seasons
Princeton
Princeton
Princeton
Princeton